Charlotte Ann Zucker (née Lefstein; March 10, 1921 – September 5, 2007) was an American actress. She was the mother of filmmakers David and Jerry Zucker, and appeared in many of their films.

Early life and education
Zucker was born on March 10, 1921, and grew up in Manhattan. Her father, Harry Lefstein, was a tailor, and her mother, Sarah (née Seiden) was a housewife. She earned a degree in speech and theater at Brooklyn College, and appeared in stage performances at the Henry Street Neighborhood Playhouse. She then moved to Milwaukee to teach English at a junior high school. She graduated from the University of Wisconsin in Madison with a master's degree.

Career
Zucker had appeared in community theater productions in Florida and in Shorewood, Wisconsin. She was a member of the Jewish Community Center Readers Theater-Milwaukee. She made her screen debut on The Kentucky Fried Movie (1977). She appeared in a total of 17 films, including Airplane!, Ghost, First Knight and Rat Race, which were directed and produced by her sons, David and Jerry Zucker. She also appeared at the Second Avenue Theater, New York, reading selections from Molly Picon's autobiography.

Personal life
From 1941 to her death in 2007, she was married to Burton Zucker, who was a real estate developer. She had three children, David, Jerry and Susan. On September 5, 2007, Zucker died from cancer in Shorewood, Wisconsin, aged 86. She was buried at Second Home Cemetery in Greenfield, Wisconsin.

Filmography

Film

Television

References

External links
 
 

1921 births
2007 deaths
20th-century American actresses
21st-century American actresses
Actresses from New York City
American film actresses
Brooklyn College alumni
Burials in Wisconsin
Deaths from cancer in Wisconsin
University of Wisconsin–Madison alumni